WPTE (94.9 FM) is a hot adult contemporary formatted broadcast radio station licensed to Virginia Beach, Virginia, serving Hampton Roads.  WPTE is owned and operated by Audacy, Inc. WPTE's studios are located on Clearfield Avenue in Virginia Beach, while its transmitter is located in Chesapeake.

History

The station signed on May 5, 1984 as easy listening-formatted WNRN, "Winner 95". On March 3, 1987, WNRN changed its call letters to WJQI to stand for the new "Joy 95" branding, and would shift to Soft AC. By 1994, the station evolved to Hot AC and adopted the "Q94.9" branding before flipping to "94.9 The Point" in March 1996, with the call letters changing to the current WPTE on May 6, 1996.

References

External links

PTE
Hot adult contemporary radio stations in the United States
Radio stations established in 1984
Audacy, Inc. radio stations